Lied or Lieder may refer to:
 Lied, the German word for "song", usually used for the setting of romantic German poems to music
 Past tense and past participle of lie, a deliberate untruth

People
 Finn Lied (1916–2014), Norwegian military researcher and politician
 Harald U. Lied (1927–2002), Norwegian politician
 Bernard Lieder (1923-2020), American politician

Places
 Lied Bluff, a rocky hill near Club Lake in the north-central part of Breidnes Peninsula in the Vestfold Hills of Antarctica
 Lied Center for Performing Arts, a performing arts facility in Lincoln, Nebraska, opened 1990
 Lied Discovery Children's Museum, in Las Vegas
 Lied Glacier, a glacier close north of Cape Arkona on the southwest side of Heard Island in the southern Indian Ocean
 Lied Jungle, a large rainforest exhibit in the Henry Doorly Zoo and Aquarium in Omaha, Nebraska
 Lied Library, in the University of Nevada, Las Vegas campus in Paradise, Nevada

Music
 Lieder, album by Adel Tawil

See also
Lie (disambiguation)
Lying (disambiguation)